Taft College is a public community college in Taft, California. It is a part of the California Community Colleges system and is accredited by the Accrediting Commission for Community and Junior Colleges. The college is one of only a few community colleges in California to have on-campus housing.

The college was founded in 1922 as Taft Junior College. Initially, it was part of the Taft Union High School District with classes held on the campus of Taft Union High School. The college switched to its current name in 1954 and opened its own separate campus adjacent to the high school in 1956.

Taft College offers Associate in Arts and Associate in Science degrees as well as a variety of certificates. Graduates who complete specified programs are prepared for transfer to the California State University or University of California systems.

History

In 1910 Taft had a population of 1,650, but within eight years that number swelled to 4,000. New schools were built at all levels to keep up with population growth. Taft Union High School (TUHS) District was formed in July 1920, with the expectation that a junior college would shortly follow. On August 30, 1922, the TUHS Board voted to create Taft Junior College, with the first classes being held on the grounds of the high school.

During the Second World War Taft hosted a training school for the United States Army Air Corps at Gardner Field. In October 1947 TUHS purchased leftover buildings from the defunct Gardner and Minter Fields. The junior college moved into these remodeled structures on August 27, 1948.

By 1954 the population of Taft had reached 16,100 and Taft Junior College clearly required its own campus. On July 1 preliminary plans for the new campus were approved and the institution officially changed its name to Taft College. Construction began in May 1955 and the new campus opened its doors on September 11, 1956.

In 1962 voters created a new College District and the college separated completely from TUHS. In October 1964 construction began on the first dormitories and students took up residence the following year. The Science Building opened in 1966, the Technical Arts Building in 1967, the Vocational Ed Building in 1969 and the library annex in 1970. A new gymnasium was added in 1981.

Throughout the 1980s and into the 1990s Taft College featured highly in sports, particularly in football. In 1994 the college was forced to eliminate all athletic programs due to budget cuts. Some programs (but not football) were later restored.

In March 2004 voters approved a $39.8 million bond to finance renovation of existing college facilities and expand into new structures. The work is ongoing as of May 2012. The total cost is estimated at around $100 million.

Academics
Taft College focuses on preparing students for career advancement in their current field or for further study at four-year institutions. The college's mission emphasizes basic skills and service to students. A variety of associate degrees are available in Arts and Sciences, together with certificates in specific subject areas.

Since 1993 the college has offered degrees in dental hygiene, and the Dental Hygiene Clinic is open to the public. Taft College also runs the Transition to Independent Living (TIL) Program, which trains young adults with developmental disabilities in the responsibilities of living on their own. "The Children's Center is the largest single-site child care facility in the California Community College system."

Student life

In fall 2011 Taft College enrolled just over 5,000 students, of whom 29% were first-time attendees. The student population was 62% male. Forty-eight percent were age 24 or younger. Hispanics represented 49% of the student body and white non-Hispanics 39%, with no other race exceeding 5%. In Fall 2011 98.5% of students came from high schools within California, overwhelmingly from Kern County.

The vast majority of students commute to school, but about 200 live on-campus in two residence halls.

The Associated Student Body is the "official governing organization of students enrolled at Taft College." Students participate in a variety of clubs. The college sponsors a student literary magazine, A Sharp Piece of Awesome, and a newspaper, Black Gold. There are two honor societies, Phi Theta Kappa and the National Society of Leadership and Success.

Governance

Taft College is the sole college within the West Kern Community College District (WKCCD).

The WKCCD is overseen by a five-member Board of Trustees, who are responsible for maintaining high standards in college operations, selecting a Superintendent/President, outlining District policy and assuring the District's financial stability. Board members are elected by the voters in the WKCCD for a four-year term, staggered so that half the Board is up for election in each even-numbered year.

Faculty members are represented by the Faculty Association. Other employees are represented by the California School Employees Association (CSEA). Students are represented by the Associated Student Body.

Notable staff and alumni
 Scott Baker, Major League Baseball player
 Al Baldock, football coach at Taft College from 1976-1991
 Don Bandy, football player for the Washington Redskins and professor at Taft College for 33 years
 Ronald Bryan "Ron" Coomer, nicknamed "Coom Dawg", former first baseman and third baseman in Major League Baseball and the current color analyst and play-by-play broadcaster for the Chicago Cubs on WSCR 670 AM
 Miguel Ibarra, soccer player for the Minnesota Stars and recently called up by the USMNT
 George Kersh, world class 800 meters runner, Goodwill Games champion and national Community College record holder
 Homer Baird Kidwell, class of 1930, justice of the State Supreme Court of Hawaii
 Mike Perez, former NFL player
 Jason Phillips, former NFL player
 Brandon Rock, Olympic 800 meters runner.
 Tracy Rogers, former NFL player
 Dante Scarnecchia, former NFL assistant coach

Notes

See also
 Taft Union High School
 Taft City School District - Elementary and junior high schools

References

External links
 Official website

 
Universities and colleges in Kern County, California
Educational institutions established in 1922
Schools accredited by the Western Association of Schools and Colleges
California Community Colleges
1922 establishments in California